Anastasia Dmitrievna Simanovich (born 23 January 1995) is a Russian water polo player.

She was part of the Russian team at the 2015 World Aquatics Championships. She participated in the 2016 Summer Olympics.

See also
 List of Olympic medalists in water polo (women)
 List of World Aquatics Championships medalists in water polo

References

External links
 

Russian female water polo players
Living people
Place of birth missing (living people)
1995 births
Water polo players at the 2016 Summer Olympics
Olympic water polo players of Russia
Olympic bronze medalists for Russia
Olympic medalists in water polo
Medalists at the 2016 Summer Olympics
World Aquatics Championships medalists in water polo
Water polo players at the 2020 Summer Olympics
People from Kirishi
Sportspeople from Leningrad Oblast
21st-century Russian women